Mohammad Umer (19 April 1955 – 2 October 2021), known professionally as Umer Shareef, was a Pakistani actor, comedian, director, producer, singer and television personality.

Umer began his career at the age of 14 with stand-up comedy and later worked in around 60 stage comedies as well numerous television shows and films, where he not only acted but also directed and produced.

Early life
Mohammad Umer was born on 19 April 1955, into a middle-class Muhajir family in Liaquatabad, Karachi. The youngest of his siblings, he lost his father when he was 4.

Career

Stage work
In 1974, Umer started his career from Karachi as a stage performer at the age of 19. He joined theatre, using the stage name Umer Zarif, modelled after his favourite comedian Munawar Zarif, but later renamed himself to Umer Sharif following Egyptian actor Omar Sharif that he admired due to the 1962-movie Lawrence of Arabia. 

In 1976, he wrote the stage play Bionic Servant, inspired by the American TV series Six Million Dollar Man, Moin Akhter starring as an actor, which would be their first collaboration.

Some of his extremely popular comedy stage plays were 1989's Bakra Qistoon Pe and Buddha Ghar Pe Ha.

Sharif became a very popular star during this period. Much of the success came from the fact that he started to record his stage shows and his videotapes were rented out in a similar manner to movies. Yes Sir Eid and No Sir Eid were among the first stage plays to come out on video.

Television
In 2002, Sharif wrote his first TV serial, Parda Na Uthao.

In October 2009, he started hosting his own late-night talk show, The Shareef Show, on Geo TV. He interviewed many actors, entertainers, musicians, and politicians on the show. Another of his shows was Umer Sharif vs Umer Sharif, where he donned over 400 get-ups. He also appeared as a guest judge on the Indian stand-up comedy show The Great Indian Laughter Challenge, alongside Navjot Singh Siddhu, and Shekhar Suman.

Films 
Sharif's first movie was Hisaab (1986) but he's better known for Mr 420 (1992), a movie where he not only acted but also directed, wrote and sung in, that led to a revival of Pakistan's cinema till 1998 and also influenced Bollywood, facilitating the idea of the "comedian hero", unheard of in the '90s, and thus the career of someone like Govinda.

He would work in some 35 films, his last movie being Chand Babu (1999), that he directed, produced and acted in.

Awards 
Sharif received National awards for Best Director and Best Actor in 1992 for Mr. 420. He received ten Nigar Awards. Sharif was the only actor to receive four Nigar Awards in a single year. He received three Graduate Awards. Sharif was also a recipient of Tamgha-e-Imtiaz.

Politics 
In 2007, Sharif announced he had joined MQM, saying he had done so because the party was open-minded and ‘best for Karachi’. In 2011, backed by the MQM, he ran for the presidency of the Karachi Arts Council. But the PPP-backed candidate, Ahmed Shah, defeated him.

Humanitarian work
In 2006, the Umer Sharif Welfare Trust was formed with the stated goal of creating a "state of the art health center that provides services free of cost."

Controversies
For the 50-year anniversary of Pakistan's independence, Sharif performed a play called Umer Sharif Haazir Ho. In the play, a representative from many occupations were called into court and asked what they had done for Pakistan in the past 50 years. The Lawyer's Association stated a case against Sharif as a result.

Illness and death 
On 10 September 2021, Pakistani television host and news anchor Waseem Badami posted a video of Shareef on Instagram where he requested the then Prime Minister of Pakistan Imran Khan facilitate cancer treatment for him overseas. Soon after the video came out, Indian singer Daler Mehndi also appealed to Prime Minister Imran Khan for immediate treatment for Sharif. On 11 September 2021, the government formed a medical board to decide whether or not to send him abroad for treatment. He was granted a United States visa for medical treatment on 16 September 2021 and the Sindh government also approved 40 million rupees for his treatment. Despite all these projects, on 2 October 2021, he died in a hospital in Nuremberg, Germany, at the age of 66.

Influence and legacy 
Referred to as the "King of Comedy", Sharif is considered to be one of the greatest comedians of South Asia. Popular Indian comedians like Johnny Lever hailed him as "The God of Asian comedy".

Leading Pakistani in show business and political leaders offered their condolences including Mehwish Hayat, Hareem Farooq and Imran Khan (Prime Minister of Pakistan).

Filmography

Stage dramas 
 Bakra Qiston Pay Part 1, 2, 3, 4, 5 (1989)
Dulhan Main Lekar Jaonga
 Salam Karachi (2005)
 Andaz Apna Apna
 Meri Bhi To Eid Karade
 Nayee Aami Purana Abba (2004)
 Yeh Hay Naya Tamasha (1993)
 Yeh Hay Naya Zamana (2003)
 Yes Sir Eid No Sir Eid (1989)
 Eid Tere Naam
 No Parking (1985)
 Samad Bond 007
 Nach Meri Bulbul
 Lahore se London
 Angoor Khatay Hain
 Petrol Pump
 Lotay te Lafafey
 Loot Sale (2004)
 Half Plate
 Meri Jaan Thanedaar
 Umar Sharif in Jungle
 Beauty Parlour (1998)
 Makeup Room
 Chaudhary Plaza (2004)
 Mamu Mazak Mat Karo (1993)
 Hum Se Milo
 Yeh To House Full Hogaya
 Bakra Munna Bhai (2004)
 Behrupia
 Lal Qile ki Rai Lalu Khet ka Raja
 Chand Baraye Farokhat (2003)
 Hanste Raho Chalte Raho (2003)
 Umar Sharif Hazir Ho (1997)
 Baby Samjha Karo
 Doctor aur Kasai
 Budha Ghar Pe Hai
 Eid Aashiqon Ki
 Nehle pe Dehla
 One Day Eid Match (1992)
 Police Ho To Aisi
 Paying Guest (2003)
 Aao Sach Bolain
 Flight 420
 Coolie 420
 Hamsa Ho To Samn Aaye (1994)
 Walima Taiyar Hai
 Filmi Pariyan
 Akbar e Azam in Pakistan
 Jeet Teri Peda Mera
 Shadi Magar Aadhi
 Bebia
 Mano Meri Baat
 Gol Maal
 Female Ki Email
 Eidy Chupa ke Rakhna
 Dulha (2002)

Film

Reality shows

References

External links
https://www.facebook.com/OmerSharifOfficial?ref=hl

1955 births
2021 deaths
Geo News newsreaders and journalists
Comedians from Karachi
Male actors from Karachi
Muhajir people
Nigar Award winners
Pakistani male comedians
Pakistani dramatists and playwrights
Pakistani film directors
Pakistani film producers
Urdu film producers
Pakistani male stage actors
Pakistani male television actors
Pakistani stand-up comedians
ARY Digital people
Recipients of Tamgha-e-Imtiaz